The 10th District of the Iowa Senate is located in southwestern Iowa, and is currently composed of Adair, Cass, Dallas, Guthrie, and Polk Counties.

Current elected officials
Jake Chapman is the senator currently representing the 10th District.

The area of the 10th District contains two Iowa House of Representatives districts:
The 19th District (represented by Carter Nordman)
The 20th District (represented by Ray Sorensen)

The district is also located in Iowa's 3rd congressional district, which is represented by U.S. Representative Cindy Axne.

Past senators
The district has previously been represented by:

Alvin Miller, 1983-1992
Merlin Bartz, 1993-2002
Amanda Ragan, 2002
Donald Redfern, 2003-2004
Jeff Danielson, 2005-2012
Jake Chapman, 2013-present

See also
Iowa General Assembly
Iowa Senate

References

10